Ramathibodi Hospital Halt is a railway halt in Ratchathewi District, Bangkok. It is served by most commuter and ordinary trains coming to and from Bangkok Hua Lamphong station and one from Rangsit. It is located next to Chitralada railway station for the Chitralada Royal Villa, which is only used by the Royal Family in traveling by train.

References
 
 
 

Railway stations in Bangkok